(Gilbert) Timothy Lariston Elliot-Murray-Kynynmound, 7th Earl of Minto (born 1 December 1953), styled Viscount Melgund between 1975 and 2005, was the chief executive of British stationery company Paperchase. He is the son of the late Gilbert Elliot-Murray-Kynynmound, 6th Earl of Minto and his first wife, Lady Caroline Child Villiers. The Earl resides in England, but has continuing links with Scotland, as his parents did.

He succeeded his father in the earldom on 7 September 2005. His father's estate has been the subject of a dispute between the Earl and his father's third wife.

On 30 July 1983, he married Diana Barbara Trafford, daughter of Brian and Audrey (née Taylor) Trafford. They have two sons and one daughter; a third son is deceased.

The Earl became a member of the House of Lords in October 2022, having finished second in a by-election to replace both the Viscount Ullswater and the Baron Colwyn.

Children
 Gilbert Francis Elliot-Murray-Kynynmound, Viscount Melgund (b. 1984)
 The Hon. Lorne David Elliot-Murray-Kynynmound (b. & d. 1986)
 The Hon. Michael Timothy Elliot-Murray-Kynynmound (b. 1987)
 Lady Clare Patricia Elliot-Murray-Kynynmound (b. 1991)

References

External links
Timothy Elliot-Murray-Kynynmound, 7th Earl of Minto

1953 births
Living people
Earls in the Peerage of the United Kingdom
Conservative Party (UK) hereditary peers

Hereditary peers elected under the House of Lords Act 1999